The Central District of Rudsar County is a district (bakhsh) in Rudsar County, Gilan Province, Iran. At the 2006 census, its population was 57,509, in 16,975 families.  The District has one city: Rudsar. The District has two rural districts (dehestan): Chini Jan Rural District and Reza Mahalleh Rural District.

References 

Rudsar County
Districts of Gilan Province